Neil Layton Fergusson (September 5, 1908 – February 27, 1994) was a Canadian politician. He represented the electoral district of Cape Breton East in the Nova Scotia House of Assembly from 1956 to 1970. He was a member of the Nova Scotia Progressive Conservative Party.

Fergusson was born in Port Morien, Nova Scotia. He attended Dalhousie University and McGill University and was a lawyer. He married Grace Avery in 1945. He served in the Executive Council of Nova Scotia as Minister without portfolio, Minister of Municipal Affairs and Minister of Labour. He died in 1994.

References

1936 births
1994 deaths
Progressive Conservative Association of Nova Scotia MLAs
Members of the Executive Council of Nova Scotia
People from Glace Bay
Dalhousie University alumni
McGill University alumni